The College Coquette is a 1929 American drama film directed by George Archainbaud and written by Norman Houston. The film stars Ruth Taylor, William Collier Jr., Jobyna Ralston, John Holland, Adda Gleason and Gretchen Hartman. The film was released on August 5, 1929, by Columbia Pictures.

Cast        
Ruth Taylor as Betty Forrester
William Collier Jr. as Tom Marion
Jobyna Ralston as Doris Marlowe
John Holland as Coach Harvey Porter
Adda Gleason as Mrs. Ethel Forrester
Gretchen Hartman as Mrs. Marlowe
Frances Lyons as Edna
Edward Peil Jr. as Slim
Eddie Clayton as Ted 
Maurice Murphy as Jimmy Doolittle
Billy Taft as Boy with ukulele

References

External links
 

1929 films
1920s English-language films
Silent American drama films
1929 drama films
Columbia Pictures films
Films directed by George Archainbaud
American silent feature films
American black-and-white films
1920s American films